His Brother's Keeper is a 1940 British crime film directed by Roy William Neill and starring Clifford Evans, Tamara Desni and Una O'Connor.

It was made at Teddington Studios as a second feature. It had been completed before the outbreak of the Second World War.

Plot
A successful sharp shooting act is threatened when a gold-digging blues singer attempts to split them up.

Cast
 Clifford Evans as Jack Cornell 
 Tamara Desni as Olga 
 Una O'Connor as Eva 
 Peter Glenville as Hicky 
 Reginald Purdell as Bunny Reeves 
 Ronald Frankau as George Hollis 
 Antoinette Lupino as Pat 
 Aubrey Dexter as Sylvester 
 Frederick Burtwell as Harry 
 Roddy McDowall as Boy

References

Bibliography
 Chibnall, Steve & McFarlane, Brian. The British 'B' Film. Palgrave MacMillan, 2009.

External links

1940 films
British crime films
1940 crime films
Films shot at Teddington Studios
Warner Bros. films
Films directed by Roy William Neill
1940s English-language films
1940s British films